Králova Lhota may refer to places in the Czech Republic:

Králova Lhota (Písek District)
Králova Lhota (Rychnov nad Kněžnou District)